The second season of the tattoo reality competition Ink Master premiered on Spike on October 9 and concluded December 18, 2012 with a total of 13 episodes. The show is hosted and judged by Jane's Addiction guitarist Dave Navarro, with accomplished tattoo artists Chris Núñez and Oliver Peck serving as series regular judges. The winner received a $100,000 cash prize, a feature in Inked Magazine and the title of Ink Master.

The winner of the second season of Ink Master was Steve Tefft, with Sarah Miller being the runner-up.

Contestants
Names, experience, and cities stated are at time of filming.

Notes
† Indicates that the contestant died after filming ended

Contestant progress

  The contestant won Ink Master.
 The contestant was the runner-up.
 The contestant finished third in the competition.
 The contestant advanced to the finale.
 The contestant won Best Tattoo of the Day.
 The contestant was among the top.
 The contestant received positive critiques.
 The contestant received negative critiques.
 The contestant was in the bottom.
 The contestant was eliminated from the competition.
 The contestant withdrew from the competition due to medical reasons.
 The contestant returned as a guest for that episode.

Episodes

References

External links
 
 
 

2012 American television seasons
Season 2